HOT-2 (2,5-dimethoxy-4-(β-ethylthio)-N-hydroxyphenethylamine) is a psychedelic phenethylamine of the 2C family.  It was presumably first synthesized by Alexander Shulgin and reported in his book PiHKAL.

Chemistry

HOT-2's full chemical name is 2-[4-(2-ethylthio)-2,5-dimethoxyphenyl–N–hydroxyethanamine.  It has structural properties similar to 2C-T-2 and to other drugs in the HOT- series, with the most closely related compounds being HOT-7 and HOT-17.

General information

The dosage range of HOT-2 is typically 10-18 mg and its duration is approximately 6–10 hours according to Shulgin.  HOT-2 produces visuals and moving, flowing lights.  It also causes euphoria and increases blood pressure.

Legality

United Kingdom
This substance is a Class A drug in the Drugs controlled by the UK Misuse of Drugs Act.

See also
Phenethylamine

References

Psychedelic phenethylamines
Thioethers
Phenol ethers
Hydroxylamines